Institute of Comparative Law may refer to:

Institute of Comparative Law (McGill University), Montreal, Canada
Paris Institute of Comparative Law, France
Swiss Institute of Comparative Law, Switzerland

See also
Tilburg Institute of Comparative and Transnational Law, Netherlands
Max Planck Institute for Comparative Public Law and International Law, Heidelberg, Germany
Max Planck Institute for Comparative and International Private Law, Hamburg, Germany